Bismarck High School (BHS) is a public high school located in Bismarck, North Dakota. It currently serves 1,197 students and is a part of the Bismarck Public Schools system. The grades offered at Bismarck High school are ninth through twelfth. The student body consists of 50.45 percent male and 49.55 percent female. The official school colors are maroon and white and its athletic teams are known as the Demons. It is one of three high schools in Bismarck.

History

BHS was originally established in 1873, with a subsequent building in 1912, then the core of the present building in 1934–35.

The present building, designed in the Classical Moderne (or PWA Moderne) style was, at the time, the largest Public Works Administration (PWA) project in the state. Designed by architect Robert A. Ritterbush of Ritterbush Brothers, the general contractor was Maurice Schumacher (Minneapolis). The exterior brick with stone lintels for doorways and window frames, and aluminum spandrels for decoration. The pilasters between the window bays are fluted. Three roof elevations on the gymnasium wing, with locker rooms, stage, and gymnasium proper. The foundation is dull-rose colored Kasota limestone; Hebron faced brick in a greyish brown color; the only wood initially used in the structure were for finishing purposes and some of the floors. It was constructed just north of the 1912 building, which was converted into a junior high school and demolished ahead of school's expansion in 1962-63 (also designed by Ritterbush Brothers).

649 students enrolled, though only half of that was expected. It remained the only high school in Bismarck until 1975 when Century High School was built.

Athletics

Championships
State Class 'A' boys' basketball: 1930, 1933, 1953, 1957, 1958, 1959, 1972, 1994, 2000, 2001, 2005, 2008, 2010
State Class 'A' girls' basketball: 1991,2009
State Class 'A' football: 1928, 1929, 1943, 1949, 1962, 1984, 1985
State Class 'AAA' football: 2001, 2008, 2009, 2011, 2012, 2018
State girls' hockey: 2006, 2007, 2013
State Class 'A' wrestling: "Individual Tournament"
1960, 1961, 1962, 1963, 1965, 1972, 1973, 1974, 1975, 1976, 1978, 1979, 1980, 1981, 1982, 1983, 1984, 1986, 1989, 1991, 1992, 1996, 1998, 2000, 2002, 2003, 2004, 2005, 2008, 2009, 2010, 2011, 2014, 2015, 2016, 2018, 2019, 2020, 2021, 2022
State Class 'A' wrestling: "Dual Team"
2000, 2001, 2002, 2003, 2004, 2005, 2006, 2007, 2008, 2009, 2011, 2015, 2016, 2017, 2018, 2020, 2021, 2022
State boys' soccer: 1996, 1997, 2015, 2017
State girls' soccer: 2000, 2005
State Class 'A' boys' track and field: 1929, 1930, 1932, 1933 co-champions, 1945, 1946, 1947, 1948, 1949, 1950, 1951, 1952, 1957, 1958, 1968, 1969, 1970, 1971, 1972, 1973, 1991, 1993, 1994, 2004, 2005, 2006, 2007, 2008, 2009, 2010, 2011, 2012, 2013, 2014
State Class 'A' girls' track and field: 1983, 2006, 2008, 2010
State Class 'A' volleyball: 1984
State Class 'A' baseball: 2003, 2014

Records

Track and Field

Notable alumni

Mike Peluso, professional hockey player
Weston Dressler, CFL player for the Winnipeg Blue Bombers
Greg Eslinger, professional football player
Harold Schafer, businessman
Jamalcolm Liggins, professional football player

References

External links

 Bismarck High School website

Public high schools in North Dakota
Buildings and structures in Bismarck, North Dakota
North Dakota High School Activities Association (Class A)
North Dakota High School Activities Association (Class AAA Football)
Schools in Burleigh County, North Dakota
Educational institutions established in 1873
1873 establishments in Dakota Territory